Jaime Ignacio Jornet Guijarro (born 6 January 1987) is a Spanish footballer who plays as a forward.

Club career
Jornet was born in Elda, Province of Alicante. A product of local Alicante CF and Hércules CF's youth systems, he made his senior debut with Valencian neighbours CD Eldense. In 2010 he joined FC Jove Español San Vicente, also in the community and the fourth division.

After nearly two seasons of play with Jove, scoring 22 goals in his second, Jornet terminated his contract and signed for Elche CF on 19 April 2012. He was initially assigned to the B-side.

Jornet played the entire 2012 preseason with Elche's main squad, scoring in all games except against UD Almería. This prompted the fans to demand his presence in the first team's roster and, after the injuries of Miguel Linares and Berry Powel, this came to fruition.

On 26 August 2012, Jornet made his debut in the second level, coming off the bench to replace Jordi Xumetra in a 2–1 away win against Hércules. However, on 31 January of the following year, he was released by Elche alongside Ricardo Buitrago; he immediately signed a contract with CD Alcoyano in division three.

In the summer of 2013, Jornet returned to Jove Español and the fourth tier, but left only two months later. Shortly after, he moved to fellow league club Yeclano Deportivo, changing teams again in January of the following year after signing with Ontinyent CF in the third division.

Save for a very brief spell in Iceland with Íþróttafélagið Huginn, Jornet competed in the Spanish lower leagues until his retirement.

References

External links

1987 births
Living people
People from Elda
Sportspeople from the Province of Alicante
Spanish footballers
Footballers from the Valencian Community
Association football forwards
Segunda División players
Segunda División B players
Tercera División players
Hércules CF B players
CD Eldense footballers
Elche CF Ilicitano footballers
Elche CF players
CD Alcoyano footballers
Yeclano Deportivo players
Ontinyent CF players
Novelda CF players
CD Olímpic de Xàtiva footballers
Spanish expatriate footballers
Expatriate footballers in Iceland
Spanish expatriate sportspeople in Iceland